Olan Mills may refer to:

Olan Mills, a photography studio chain
Olan Mills Sr. (1904 – 1978), American photographer and founder of Olan Mills photography
Olan Mills II (born 1930), American executive who succeeded his father at Olan Mills photography